Euthalia duda, the blue duchess, is a species of nymphalid butterfly found in South Asia.

Subspecies
E. d. duda Sikkim  Burma
E. d. amplifascia Tytler, 1940  Northeast Burma
E. d. sakota Fruhstorfer, 1913 Yunnan
E. d. bellula Yokochi, 2005 Laos, Vietnam

References

D
Butterflies of Asia
Butterflies described in 1855